George Howard Herbig (January 2, 1920 – October 12, 2013) was an American astronomer at the University of Hawaii Institute for Astronomy.  He is perhaps best known for the discovery of Herbig–Haro objects.

Background
Born in 1920 in Wheeling, West Virginia, Herbig received his Ph.D in 1948 at the University of California, Berkeley; his dissertation is titled A Study of Variable Stars in Nebulosity.

Career
His specialty was stars at an early stage of evolution (a class of intermediate mass pre–main sequence stars are named Herbig Ae/Be stars after him) and the interstellar medium. He was perhaps best known for his discovery, with Guillermo Haro, of the Herbig–Haro objects; bright patches of nebulosity excited by bipolar outflow from a star being born.

Herbig also made prominent contributions to the field of diffuse interstellar band (DIB) research, especially through a series of nine articles published between 1963 and 1995 entitled "The diffuse interstellar bands."

Honors
Awards
Helen B. Warner Prize for Astronomy of the American Astronomical Society (1955)
Foreign Scientific Member, Max-Planck-Institut für Astronomie, Heidelberg
Henry Norris Russell Lectureship of the AAS (1975)
Médaille, Université de Liège (1969)
Bruce Medal of the Astronomical Society of the Pacific (1980)
Petrie Prize and Lectureship of the Canadian Astronomical Society (1995)
Named after him

Asteroid 11754 Herbig
Herbig Ae/Be stars
Herbig–Haro objects

Selected publications
"High-Resolution Spectroscopy of FU Orionis Stars", ApJ 595 (2003) 384–411 
"The Young Cluster IC 5146", AJ 123 (2002) 304–327 
"Barnard's Merope Nebula Revisited: New Observational Results", AJ 121 (2001) 3138–3148 
"The Diffuse Interstellar Bands", Annu. Rev. Astrophys. 33 (1995) 19–73
"The Unusual Pre-Main-Sequence star VY Tauri", ApJ 360 (1990) 639–649
"The Structure and Spectrum of R Monocerotis", ApJ 152 (1968) 439
"The Spectra of Two Nebulous Objects Near NGC 1999", ApJ 113 (1951) 697

References

Further reading
 Reipurth, Bo. GEORGE HERBIG and Early Stellar Evolution. Institute for Astronomy, University of Hawaii, Special Publications No. 1.

1920 births
Members of the United States National Academy of Sciences
American astronomers
2013 deaths
University of California, Berkeley alumni
University of Hawaiʻi faculty
People from Wheeling, West Virginia